The following are lists of schools in Beijing.

By district
 List of schools in Changping District
 List of schools in Chaoyang District
 List of schools in Daxing District
 List of schools in Dongcheng District
 List of schools in Fangshan District
 List of schools in Fengtai District
 List of schools in Haidian District
 List of schools in Huairou District
 List of schools in Mentougou District
 List of schools in Miyun District
 List of schools in Pinggu District
 List of schools in Shijingshan District
 List of schools in Shunyi District
 List of schools in Tongzhou District
 List of schools in Xicheng District
 List of schools in Yanqing District

By type
 List of international schools in Beijing

See also
 Education in Beijing
 Beijing Municipal Commission of Education

 

Schools